Mohammad Ghaffari, better known as Kamal-ol-Molk, was an Iranian painter and part of the Ghaffari family in Kashan.

Biography
Mohammad Ghaffari, better known as Kamal-ol-Molk, born in Kashan in 1848, to a family with a strong artistic tradition, tracing their origins back to notable painters during the reign of Nader Shah. Kamal's uncle, Mirza Abolhassan Khan Ghaffari, known as Sanee-ol-Molk, a celebrated 19th-century  painter, was notable for his watercolor portraiture. His father, Mirza Bozorg Ghaffari Kashani, was the founder of Iran's painting school and a famous artist as well. His brother, Abutorab Ghaffari, was also a distinguished painter of his time. Mohammad developed an interest in calligraphy and painting at a young age. In his childhood eagerness, he drew charcoal sketches on the walls of his room.

Upon completion of his primary education, Mohammad moved to Tehran. He may have studied painting for a time with  Mirza Esma'il.  To further his studies, he registered in Dar-ul-Funun School, a modern institute of higher learning in Persia, where he studied painting with Mozayyen-od-Doleh, a well-known painter who had visited Europe and studied Western art. He studied there for a period of three years. In his school days, the young Ghaffari was given the name Mirza Mohammad Kashi. During his education he began to attract public attention as a talented artist.

In his visits to Dar-ul-Funun, Naser al-Din Shah Qajar came to know Mohammad Ghaffari and invited him to the court. Mohammad further improved his technique, and Nasereddin Shah gave him the title "Kamal-ol-Molk" (Perfection on Land).

During the years he stayed at Nasereddin Shah Qajar's court, Kamal-ol-Molk created some of his most significant works. The paintings he did in this period, which lasted up until the assassination of Nasereddin Shah, were portraits of important people, landscapes, paintings of royal camps and hunting grounds, and various parts of royal palaces.

In this busiest period of Kamal-ol-Molk's artistic life, he created over 170 paintings. However, most of these paintings have either been destroyed or taken abroad. The works he created in this period indicate his desire to develop his oil painting technique. He advanced so much that he even acquired laws of perspective by himself and applied them to his works. His mastery in the delicate use of a brush was as well as bright and lively colors distinguished him from his contemporaries.

Visit to Europe

Following Naser al-Din Shah Qajar's death, Kamal-ol-Molk found it impossible to work under his son, Mozaffar ad-Din Shah Qajar. Therefore, he set out for Europe in 1898, at the age of 47 to improve his art. Once there, he had discussions with distinguished European artists on style and technique, and copied some of Rembrandt's works, including  "Self Portrait", "Jonah", and "Saint Matthew". Kamal-ol-Molk visited most of Europe's museums and closely studied the works of some well-known artists such as Raphael, Titian,  and adapted and altered some of their works. He stayed in Europe for about four years. In 1902, he returned to Iran, after which he became court painter to five shahs.

Migration to Iraq

The increasing pressure on Kamal-ol-Molk, originating in Mozaffar ad-Din Shah Qajar's court, left him no option but to leave his country for Iraq, in spite of all the affection he felt for Iran. The visits he made to the holy cities in Iraq inspired his work at this time. "Karbala-ye-Moalla Square", and "Baghdad Jewish Fortune Tellers" are two of his most magnificent works of this period.

With the advent of the Constitutional Movement, after a two-year stay in Iraq, Kamal-ol-Molk returned to Iran and joined the Constitutionalists because of the hatred he had developed towards Mazaffareddin Shah's government. Portraits like "Commander Asa'd Bakhtiari" and "Azad-ol-Molk" signify this period.

Kamal-ol-Molk Art School

The post-Constitutional Movement era of Persia brought about a new atmosphere for the artist. The Constitutionalists were cultured and appreciated art more than did their predecessors, thus respect for Kamal-ol-Molk and his works increased.

The master established Sanaye Mostazrafeh Art School, better known as Kamal-ol-Molk Art School, pursued his artistic career and steadied a new style in Iranian art. The School's goal was to find new talents, embrace them and educate them in the best possible way. Kamal-ol-Molk did not confine himself to painting. Rather, he introduced other arts and crafts such as carpet weaving, mosaic designing, and woodwork to his school in order to revive the dying fine arts. In addition to teaching art, through his kind behavior he also taught students love, morals and humanity. Many a time he stayed late at school, teaching. He even allotted a portion of his monthly payment to poor students.

Death
The tomb of Kamal-ol-Molk in Nishapur, Iran, in 1940. His mourners, especially family and closely related friends, marched his body next to the tomb of Sufi poet, Attar.

Gallery

See also
 Islamic art
 Iranian art
 Islamic calligraphy
 List of Iranian artists

References

External links

Kamal ol molk on Caroun.com
Ghaffari Clan website
 Panoramic Images of Kamal Tombs Neyshabur Day
 Biography and works of Kamal-ol-molk (in Persian language) 
 Biography and works of Kamal-ol-molk (in Persian language) 

1848 births
1940 deaths
People from Kashan
1898 paintings
Modern paintings
Paintings by Kamal-ol-molk
20th-century Iranian painters
19th-century Iranian painters
People of Qajar Iran